The sharp-billed treehunter (Heliobletus contaminatus) is a species of bird in the ovenbird family, Furnariidae. It is the only described member of the genus Heliobletus. The species is found in south eastern South America. Considerable confusion exists about the specific and subspecific names for this species.

Distribution and habitat
It is found in the southern Atlantic Forest, in south eastern Brazil, eastern Paraguay, northern Argentina and the extreme north east of Uruguay.
Its natural habitats are subtropical or tropical moist lowland forest and subtropical or tropical moist montane forest.

References

sharp-billed treehunter
Birds of the Atlantic Forest
sharp-billed treehunter
Taxonomy articles created by Polbot